{{DISPLAYTITLE:C4H4N2O2}}
The molecular formula C4H4N2O2 (molar mass: 112.09 g/mol, exact mass: 112.0273 u) may refer to:

 Cellocidin (2-butynediamide)
 Squaramide
 Uracil

Molecular formulas